QAD may stand for:

 QAD Inc, a software company
 q.a.d., a medical abbreviation for "every other day"
 QAD: Quintessential Art of Destruction, an MS-DOS game
 Quality Assurance Division, part of the Malaysian Qualifications Framework
 Quality Assurance Directorate, a directorate of the Royal Arsenal
 "Quick and Dirty", a method or shortcut to deliver the required result, in a non sustainable (typically manual) manner

See also 
QA (disambiguation)